Mona Nilsen (born 17 September 1973) is a Norwegian politician.

She was elected representative to the Storting from the constituency of Nordland for the period 2021–2025, for the Labour Party.

References

1973 births
Living people
Labour Party (Norway) politicians
Nordland politicians
Members of the Storting
Women members of the Storting